’Til I Die is the third album of J-ska band Potshot. The album was released in the United States by Asian Man Records in 2000.

Tracks
 Potshot Is Coming    1:42 
 Be Alive    2:11 
 My Way    1:57 
 Are You Satisfied?   2:03 
 Every Rain Lets Up    2:55 
 Prize of Game    2:11 
 Do You Laugh at Me?    1:43 
 Tell Me Why    3:04 
 More in Life    2:26 
 #3    :41 
 It’s Real    2:10 
 Hitotsu    1:53 
 Nothing in Hand    3:03 
 As You Are    2:21 
 Every Dawn    2:19 
 Mexico   13:15

References

2000 albums
Potshot (band) albums
Asian Man Records albums